The 2019–20 North Texas Mean Green men's basketball team represented the University of North Texas during the 2019–20 NCAA Division I men's basketball season. The Mean Green, led by third-year head coach Grant McCasland, played their home games at UNT Coliseum, nicknamed The Super Pit, in Denton, Texas, as members of Conference USA. They finished the season 20–12, 14–4 in C-USA play to finish as regular season C-USA champions. They were set to be the No. 1 seed in the C-USA tournament. However, the C-USA Tournament was canceled amid the COVID-19 pandemic.

Previous season 
The Mean Green finished the 2018–19 season 21–12, 8–10 in C-USA play to finish in a tie for ninth place. They lost in the quarterfinals of the C-USA tournament to Western Kentucky. They were not invited participate in postseason play.

Departures

Incoming Transfers

Recruiting class of 2019

Recruiting class of 2020

Roster

Schedule and results

|-
!colspan=12 style=| Non-conference regular season

|-
!colspan=12 style=| Conference USA regular season

|-
!colspan=12 style=| Conference USA tournament

Source

See also
 2019–20 North Texas Mean Green women's basketball team

References

North Texas Mean Green men's basketball seasons
North Texas
North Texas Mean Green men's b
North Texas Mean Green men's b